Waiting for Impact is a 10-episode limited series podcast hosted by Dave Holmes. It premiered on the Exactly Right Podcast network on October 12, 2021. It tells the story of a 1990s band Sudden Impact who disappeared after making an appearance in a Boyz II Men video. 

In addition to exploring the history of Sudden Impact, Holmes interviews other people who achieved fame in the 1990s music industry.

Production
In 1991 the band Sudden Impact appeared briefly in the music video for Boyz II Men's song "Motownphilly," which played frequently on MTV. After the video the band disappeared from the public eye. Dave Holmes took an interest in the band and their story, comparing the band's appearance to a teaser trailer for a movie that never came out.

The idea to create a project around the idea came up when Holmes realized his friend Scott M. Gimple shared his fascination with the Sudden Impact story. Holmes told Entertainment Weekly, "He is also somebody who remembers that moment really well, and when we first became friends and started talking about the weird obsessions that we share, a big show on the air was Bands Reunited on VH1. And we were like, we should get [Sudden Impact] back together and have them do the point. That was our little in-joke for a week, and it remained in the back of my mind and as my writing career took off, I was like, 'Is this a book or is it a long-form magazine piece?,' but I never quite fit it into the right template."

All 10 episodes were made available on October 12, 2021 on Stitcher Premium, and released weekly for free.

Episodes

References

External links 
Waiting for Impact website

2021 podcast debuts
Audio podcasts
American podcasts